Léopold Nord & Vous, then Les Chéris, is a Belgian band founded in 1983. In France, it can be considered as a one-hit wonder for its single "C'est l'amour", but both band and members had a long and successful musical career in Belgium.

Biography
The band was composed of three brothers : Alec (born on January 26, 1958), Benoît (February 9, 1964) and Hubert Mansion (October 7, 1960). In France, this trio remains famous for its 1987 hit song "C'est l'amour", its debut single, which was number 2 on the SNEP singles chart and certified Gold disc. The next singles, "Les Hippopotamtam" (1988) and "Des Filles et du Rock and roll" (1989) passed unnoticed and failed the chart. In 1990, the band decided to change its name and became "Les Chéris". Under this new name, the duet (Hubert Mansion has left the band then) released "On en a marre !" the same year, then "Mademoiselle qui passâtes", in 1991.

Alec Mansion debuted his singing career without his brothers. Already in the early 1980s, he released several singles whose  sales were very confidential in France, but achieved success in Belgium and Canada. Belgian singer Muriel Dacq, who participated in the production of band's first single and who is mentioned in the credits on the back of the single cover for "C'est l'amour", was Alen Mansion's wife at the time. Mansion also wrote songs for various artists such as Flash Black ("Quand je pense à elle, est-ce qu'elle pense à moi?", in 1987, co-written with his wife), and Nathalie Pâque ("Noël différent", a Christmas song), and composed "Amour Amour", which represented Luxembourg in the Eurovision Song Contest 1987. After the band split off in 1993, he tried again a solo career, releasing, among other singles, "Pop show", "Saltimbanque" and "Say l'printemps", in 2006. He then created several advertising slogans, recorded a new album and began a concert tour called 'Pop Show' (same name of his album) throughout France, tour in which the singer performed songs with a choir and musicians. Alec has four children : Antoine (born in the 1980s), Charlotte (1990), Betty (1992) and Sébastian (1998).

Benoît Mansion began to sing at the age of 18. He released his first solo album in 1994, Le Bonheur c'est quand tu veux.

In 2008, Quentin Mosimann, the winner of Star Academy 7 in France, covered "C'est l'amour" on his debut album Duel.

Discography

As Léopold Nord & Vous
 Albums
 C'est l'amour
 Singles
 1987 : "C'est l'amour" - #2 in France, Gold disc
 1988 : "Les Hippopotamtam"
 1989 : "Des Filles et du Rock and roll"

As Les Chéris
 1990 : "On en a marre !"
 1991 : "Mademoiselle qui passâtes"

As Les Frères Mansion
 1992 : "Les Travaux de la ferme"

Alec Mansion alone
 Albums
 2001 : Vivement demain - Gold in Belgium
 2004 : Pop Show

 Singles
 1980 (?) : "Dans l'eau de Nice"
 1981 (?) : "Falbala"
 1982 : "Trop triste"
 1983 : "Laid, bête et méchant"
 1984 : "Dans l'eau de Nice"
 1985 : "Chagrin d'amour"
 2001 : "Cette femme est un héros"
 1986 : "Tiens bon"
 2006 : "Pop Show"
 2006 : "Saltimbanque"
 2006 : "Say l'printemps" [sic]
 2006 : "Je m'en fous"

Benoît Mansion (solo)
 1994 : Le bonheur c'est quand tu veux
 2004 : Du Brésil dans les oreilles

References

External links
 Alec Mansion official site
 Benoît Mansion official site
 Alec Mansion and his tour, the Pop Show

Belgian pop music groups
Musical groups established in 1983
Musical groups established in 1993
1993 establishments in Belgium
Ariola Records artists